Jean-Michel Othoniel (born 27 January 1964) is a French contemporary artist. He has worked in a variety of artistic media, including film, installation, photography and sculpture. In 2000 he designed a new entrance for the Palais Royal–Musée du Louvre station of the Paris Métro.

In 2006 he showed necklaces of large beads, made by master glass-blowers in Murano, at the Peggy Guggenheim Collection in Venice; they were hung on the façade of the Palazzo Venier dei Leoni, which houses the collection.

Public collections

 Museum of Modern Art, New York, USA

References

1964 births
Living people
French contemporary artists